Aureimonas glaciei is a Gram-negative, aerobic, short rod-shaped and motile bacteria from the genus of Aurantimonas which has been isolated from the Muztagh Glacier in China.

References

External links
Type strain of Aureimonas glaciei at BacDive -  the Bacterial Diversity Metadatabase

Hyphomicrobiales
Bacteria described in 2017